Ayothiyapattinam block  is a revenue block of Salem district of the Indian state of Tamil Nadu. This revenue block consist of 32 panchayat villages. They are:

 A. N. Mangalam
 Achankuttapatty
 Adhikaripatti
 Aladipatti
 Anupur
 Chinnagoundapuram
 Chinnanur
 D. Perumapalayam
 Dasanaickenpatti
 Karipatti
 Karumapuram
 Kootathupatti
 Korathupatti
 Kullampatti
 Kuppanur
 M. Palapatti
 M. Perumapalayam
 M. Thathanur
 Masinaickenpatti
 Mettupatti
 Minnampalli
 Pallipatti
 Periyagoundapuram
 Poovanoor
 S. N. Mangalam
 Sukkampatti
 Thailanur
 Udayapatti
 Valaiyakaranur
 Valasaiyur
 Veeranam
 Vellalagundam

References 

Revenue blocks of Salem district